The Residences at Greenbelt – San Lorenzo Tower is a residential condominium skyscraper in Makati, Philippines. It is the second of three buildings being constructed as part of The Residences at Greenbelt (TRAG) complex, and is the highest of the three. It is the 11th-tallest building in the country and Metro Manila as well with a height of 204.5 metres from the ground to its architectural spire.

The building has 57 floors above ground, which includes a 4-level podium with commercial establishments, and 3 basement levels for parking. It is considered to be one of the most prestigious residential building in the Philippines.

Location

The Residences at Greenbelt complex is located along Arnaiz Avenue, formerly known as Pasay Road, and the entire complex block is bounded by Paseo de Roxas, Greenbelt Drive and Esperanza Street. The complex was formerly the site of the old Coronado Lanes bowling center and parking lot. The building is located at the Makati Central Business District and is part of the Greenbelt Complex which includes the Greenbelt Mall. Just right across Greenbelt Drive is the Renaissance Makati City Hotel.

Construction and design

The Residences at Greenbelt – San Lorenzo Tower was masterplanned and designed by Architecture International, in cooperation with local architectural firm GF & Partners Architects, which also made the Space Planning consultancy services. Structural design for the building was provided by Aromin & Sy + Associates, and reviewed by international engineering firm Skilling Ward Magnusson Berkshire.

The buildings mechanical engineering works was designed by R.J. Calpo & Partners; electrical engineering works design & security consultancy was provided by R.A. Mojica & Partners. Sanitary / plumbing engineering design and fire protection design was provided by NBF Consulting Engineers.

Other members of the design team are E.A. Aurelio + ADI Ltd. Inc. (Landscape design); ALT Cladding & Design Philippines (Exterior Cladding); C.T. Onglao Architects (San Lorenzo Tower Interior Design for common areas); and Master Charlie Chao (Feng Shui Consultant).

The construction team is composed of Jose Aliling & Associates (Project / Construction Management); Rider Hunt Liacor Inc. (Quantity Surveying); and Makati Development Corporation (General Contractor).

Property management is provided by Ayala Property Management Corporation.

During the construction phase, it is also known as the TRAG-2 Project.

See also

 The Residences at Greenbelt - Laguna Tower
 The Residences at Greenbelt - Manila Tower
 List of tallest buildings in the Philippines

References 

Skyscrapers in Makati
Residential skyscrapers in Metro Manila
Residential buildings completed in 2009